The fourth generation Ford Thunderbird is a large personal luxury car produced by Ford for the 1964 to 1966 model years. This generation of the Thunderbird was restyled in favor of a more squared-off, "formal" look. The only remnant of the Thunderbird's former sporty image was the fact that the standard 390-cubic-inch  V8 engine needed nearly 11 seconds to push the heavy T-bird to 60 mph (97 km/h). The softly sprung suspension allowed considerable body lean, wallow, and float on curves and bumps. Contemporary testers felt that the Buick Riviera, Pontiac Grand Prix and Chrysler 300K were substantially more roadworthy cars, but the Thunderbird retained its leading market share.

Models

The revised model was initially offered as a hardtop, convertible, Sports Roadster with dealer-installed tonneau cover and wire wheels, and Landau with vinyl roof, simulated landau irons, and wood grain interior appointments. Total 1964 sales were excellent at 92,465 units, up nearly fifty per cent from the previous year, but the popularity of the Sports Roadster continued to decline, with only 50 Sports Roadster sold from the factory. The 1964 Thunderbird was the only model of this generation to have the word 'Thunderbird' spelled out on the front hood instead of a chrome Thunderbird emblem. The only transmission available was the Cruise-O-Matic MX 3 speed automatic. The listed retail price for the 1964 two-door hardtop coupe was US$4,486 ($ in  dollars ),

Several features intended for the new generation were delayed until 1965, when front disc brakes became standard equipment and sequential turn signals which flashed three bulbs in the broad, horizontal tail lights from inside to outside were added; the latter had been delayed by vehicle lighting regulations in the United States. Exterior trim was revised, including a new grille, Thunderbird emblem replacing the block letters on the front edge of the hood, simulated front fender vent trim, revised Thunderbird scripts now located on the rear edge of the quarter panels, and revised taillight lens trim and a single center emblem replacing the dual lens birds and block letters respectively. The popular "Tilt-Away" steering column continued, and was a Thunderbird recognized feature that was later shared on other upper-level Ford Products. Sales, impacted by increasing competition, including cannibalism by Ford's own newly introduced, and more affordable Mustang, dipped to 74,972. Again, the Cruise-O-Matic MX automatic was the only transmission available.

Convertibles borrowed the opening mechanism from the all-new Lincoln Continental where the trunklid would open electrically in a single piece, hinged at the back of the vehicle, then the fabric top would fold down and disappear beneath the trunklid. The mechanism was originally used on the Ford Fairlane 500 Skyliner hardtop convertible of the late 1950s. Opening the trunk on convertibles for storage required that the lid be opened electrically, without deploying or retracting the folding convertible top.

All models featured a new front clip. A flatter hood, re-shaped front fenders, new headlight buckets, new egg crate grille with large Thunderbird emblem, new bumper guards, a single bumper bar, and painted roll pan replaced the previous two model year's two-piece front bumper. The rear taillights were revised, now a 3 piece unit going the full width across the rear, the backup light now located in the center section replaced the formerly rear roll pan mounted lamps. 

A new Town Sedan model was offered, which featured a roof with blind quarter panels for a more 'formal' look, at the cost of rear visibility, and removed the retractable side window for rear passengers which were offered only on the Hardtop Coupe and Convertible. The Landau trim package added to the Town Sedan a padded roof and landau S-bars. It became by far the best-selling model, accounting for 35,105 units of the 1966 model year's 69,176 units sold. The transmission used on early build 390 V8 equipped T-Birds was the Cruise-O-Matic MX, however late build 390 and all 428 V8 equipped T-Birds had the new C6 3 speed automatic installed.

Films and Popular Culture
A black 1964 Thunderbird convertible had a notable role in the TV series Highlander: The Series as protagonist Duncan Macleod’s main mode of transportation. A white 1964 Thunderbird convertible was used by Felix Leiter in a chase scene in the 1964 James Bond film  Goldfinger, starring Sean Connery. Another appears briefly in the 1965 James Bond film  Thunderball. 

A gold 1966 Town Landau was driven by Dean Martin as Matt Helm in the 1966 film  Murderers' Row. It featured several gadgets including the ability to display a scrolling message which ran across the tail-lights. The driver could dictate what they wanted to appear there into a microphone. A green 1966 Thunderbird convertible was prominently featured in the 1991 Ridley Scott film Thelma and Louise, starring Susan Sarandon and Geena Davis, a red 1966 Thunderbird convertible was featured in the 1983 film The Outsiders which was directed by Francis Ford Coppola, and a black 1965 Thunderbird Convertible was featured in the David Lynch film Wild at Heart, starring Nicolas Cage and Laura Dern. A black 1965 Thunderbird Landau was featured at the start of the Nintendo Power video N64: Change the System. It was shown transporting the three gamers to Nintendo of America headquarters for a first-hand sneak preview of Nintendo 64.
A 1964 Thunderbird Convertible was briefly seen in the Twilight Zone episode "Come Wander With Me" (S5 E34), originally broadcast on May 22, 1964.

Production totals

References

External links

 1965 427 Thunderbird 

004
Rear-wheel-drive vehicles
Coupés
Convertibles
Motor vehicles manufactured in the United States
Cars introduced in 1964
Cars discontinued in 1966
Personal luxury cars